Köln Airport-Businesspark is a railway station in Gremberghoven, Cologne in western Germany. It is served by the S12 line of the Rhine-Ruhr S-Bahn.

References 

S12 (Rhine-Ruhr S-Bahn)
Railway stations in Cologne
Rhine-Ruhr S-Bahn stations
Railway stations in Germany opened in 2004